The Tumbes swallow (Tachycineta stolzmanni) is a species of bird in the family Hirundinidae.
It is found in northwestern Peru and far southwestern Ecuador.
Its natural habitats are dry savanna, coastal saline lagoons, and arable land.

References

Tumbes swallow
Birds of Peru
Birds of the Tumbes-Chocó-Magdalena
Tumbes swallow
Taxonomy articles created by Polbot